William Cannon (17551854) was among the first pioneers in the Oregon Country and the only recorded American Revolutionary War soldier buried in Oregon. Cannon voted with the majority in favor of a provisional government.

Early life
Cannon was born in 1755 near Pittsburgh in territory claimed both by Pennsylvania and Virginia. He served in the American Revolutionary War at the Battle of Kings Mountain and at the Battle of Cowpens.

Oregon Country
While a soldier at Michigan's Fort Mackinac in 1810, Cannon was recruited by William Price Hunt to accompany an overland expedition to the Oregon Country. In his 1836 book, Astoria, Washington Irving related Cannon's unpleasant experience with a grizzly bear during the trip. The party reached Astoria in 1812. Later they traveled to French Prairie, and Etienne Lucier remained with Cannon to help start an American settlement. When John McLoughlin arrived in 1824, Cannon built a gristmill at Ft. Vancouver.
In 1843 Cannon was among the immigrants who voted in favor of forming a provisional government in the Oregon Country.

Cannon died in 1854 and was buried at St. Paul, Oregon.

References

1755 births
1854 deaths
People of Pennsylvania in the American Revolution
Champoeg Meetings
Members of the Provisional Government of Oregon
People from Marion County, Oregon
Oregon pioneers
Burials in Oregon